In spherical trigonometry, the law of cosines (also called the cosine rule for sides) is a theorem relating the sides and angles of spherical triangles, analogous to the ordinary law of cosines from plane trigonometry.

In this case, the alternative formulation of the law of haversines is preferable.

A variation on the law of cosines, the second spherical law of cosines, (also called the cosine rule for angles) states:

It can be obtained from consideration of a spherical triangle dual to the given one.

Proofs

First proof
Let , and  denote the unit vectors from the center of the sphere to those corners of the triangle.

Second proof
Let , and  denote the unit vectors from the center of the sphere to those corners of the triangle.
,
using cross products, dot products, and the Binet–Cauchy identity .

Third proof
Let , and  denote the unit vectors from the center of the sphere to those corners of the triangle. The composition of these three rotations will form an identity transform. That is, the composite rotation maps the point  to itself. These three rotational operations can be represented by quaternions:

This gives us the identity

The quaternion product on the right-hand side of this identity is given by

Equating the scalar parts on both sides of the identity, we have 

Here . Since this identity is valid for any angles, suppressing the halves, we have 

We can also recover the sine law by first noting that  and then equating the vector parts on both sides of the identity as 

Since the right-hand side of the above expression is unchanged by cyclic permutation, we have

Rearrangements
The first and second spherical laws of cosines can be rearranged to put the sides and angles on opposite sides of the equations:

Planar limit: small angles 
 

To prove this, we will use the small-angle approximation obtained from the Maclaurin series for the cosine and sine functions:
 

Substituting these expressions into the spherical law of cosines nets:

 

or after simplifying:

 

See also 
 Half-side formula
 Hyperbolic law of cosines
 Solution of triangles
 Spherical law of sines

Notes

Spherical trigonometry
Articles containing proofs
Theorems in geometry

he:טריגונומטריה ספירית#משפט הקוסינוסים